Germán Ariel Pietrobon (born 1 April 1983, in Rosario) is an Argentine football striker.

Club career
Pietrobon came through the youth system of Rosario Central, but before making his first team debut, he was transferred to CA San Martín, he then had a spell with Central Córdoba before signing with the Bulgarian club Pirin Blagoevgrad.

After 2 seasons with Pirin he signed CSKA Sofia. Pietrobon underwent trials with FC BATE Borisov, as CSKA Sofia had reached the limit of non-EU players they could use on the field, but the talks with the Belarusians eventually failed to materialize and he returned to CSKA Sofia. On 7 September 2009, Pietrobon terminated his contract with CSKA with immediate effect after a meeting with the club's bosses. A few days later, he signed with Sportist Svoge for one year.

References

External links
 Germán Pietrobon at BDFA.com.ar 

1983 births
Living people
Argentine footballers
Argentine expatriate footballers
Expatriate footballers in Bulgaria
San Martín de San Juan footballers
PFC Pirin Blagoevgrad players
PFC CSKA Sofia players
FC Sportist Svoge players
First Professional Football League (Bulgaria) players
Association football forwards
Sportspeople from Santa Fe Province